Delehanty is a surname. Notable people with the surname include:

Frances W. Delehanty (1879–1977), American artist, illustrator, and designer
Francis Blase Delehanty (1859–1932), American judge
Megan Delehanty (born 1968), Canadian rower

See also
Delahanty